Qarah Bolagh (also Romanized as Qarah Bolāgh and Qareh Bolāgh) is a village in Posht-e Arbaba Rural District, Alut District, Baneh County, Kurdistan Province, Iran. At the 2006 census, its population was 55, in 7 families. The village is populated by Kurds.

References 

Towns and villages in Baneh County
Kurdish settlements in Kurdistan Province